Joe Lavery (died 3 June 1915) was a Northern Irish sportman who competed in many events, most notably as a cyclist. He competed in three events at the 1908 Summer Olympics.

References

External links
 

Year of birth missing
1915 deaths
British male cyclists
Irish male cyclists
Olympic cyclists of Great Britain
Cyclists at the 1908 Summer Olympics
Sportspeople from Belfast
Road incident deaths in Northern Ireland